Aleksei Kadochnikov (born 31 December 1985) is a Russian professional darts player who plays in the Professional Darts Corporation events.

Darts career
In 2015, he made his television debut in the 2015 PDC World Cup of Darts, partnering Boris Koltsov, but they lost in the first round to Simon Whitlock and Paul Nicholson of Australia. In 2019, he returned to the World Cup with partner Koltsov again, losing to Austria in the first round in a high quality match..

In 2015, 2018 and 2019, he won a combined total of 6 events on the EADC Pro Tour.

References

External links

1985 births
Living people
Russian darts players
Professional Darts Corporation associate players
PDC World Cup of Darts Russian team
Sportspeople from Tver